Penokee is an unincorporated community in Graham County, Kansas, United States, in the Solomon Valley.

History
The community was originally named Reford and platted in 1888 when the railroad was extended to that point. Because the town became mistaken for Rexford, Kansas, the residents renamed their town after the Penokee Mountains near Lake Superior.

Education
The community is served by Graham County USD 281 public school district.

References

Further reading

External links
 Graham County maps: Current, Historic, KDOT

Unincorporated communities in Graham County, Kansas
Unincorporated communities in Kansas
Populated places established in 1888
1888 establishments in Kansas